OGM Ormanspor is a Turkish women's basketball club based in Ankara, Turkey. The club was founded in 1971 and currently competing in the Women's Basketball Super League.

The basketball team is part of the multi-sports club OGM Ormanspor.

Current roster

Notable players

Gülşah Akkaya (1 season: '15-'16)
Pelin Bilgiç (1 season: '19-'20)
Alperi Onar (3 season: '16-'18, '20-'21)
Özge Kavurmacıoğlu (1 season: '18-'19)
Naile İvegin (2 season: '18-'20)

Brittney Sykes (2 season: '18, '20-'21)
Jasmine Thomas (2 season: '14-'15, '17-'18)
Arike Ogunbowale (1 season: '19-'20)
Courtney Paris (1 season: '19-'20)
Riquna Williams (1 season: '20-'21)
Kahleah Copper (1 season: '18-'19)
Tiffany Mitchell (1 season: '18-'19)
Shatori Walker-Kimbrough (1 season: '17-'18)

Aneika Henry  (1 season: '18-'19)

Luca Ivanković (1 season: '17-'18)

Petra Kulichová (1 season: '17-'18)

Angel Robinson  (2 season: '19-'21)

Marie Růžičková (1 season: '18-'19)

Johannah Leedham (1 season: '19-'20)

References

External links
Official website (in Turkish)

Women's basketball teams in Turkey
Basketball teams established in 1971